The following buildings were designed by architect Frank Pierce Milburn and/or the firm Milburn & Heister.

Government and legislative buildings
 South Carolina State House dome and final completion of the project begun in 1851
 Old Florida Capitol Building, renovation and cupola, 1902
 City Hall and Theater, Darlington, South Carolina
 City Hall and Theater, Columbia, South Carolina, 1905, demolished 1936, Wade Hampton Hotel built on site, demolished 1980s
 City Hall, Rutherfordton, North Carolina, located in the Main Street Historic District
 Design for City Hall, (not built) Charleston, South Carolina
 Design for Governor's Mansion, Columbia, South Carolina (not built).

Courthouses
 Anderson County Courthouse and jail, Anderson, South Carolina, 1897
 Bath County Courthouse, Warm Springs, Virginia, 1908, burned 1912
 Berkeley County Courthouse renovation, Martinsburg, West Virginia
 Buchanan County Courthouse, Grundy, Virginia, 1915
 Buncombe County Courthouse, Asheville, North Carolina (1928)
 Clay County Courthouse, Manchester, Kentucky, 1889
 Columbia County Courthouse, Lake City, Florida, 1905 
 Dubois County Courthouse, Jasper, Indiana 1909-1911
 Durham County Courthouse, Durham, North Carolina, 1916
 Forsyth County Courthouse, Winston-Salem, North Carolina, 1893
 Fulton County Courthouse, Fulton, Kentucky
 Gaston County Courthouse, Gastonia, North Carolina
 Glynn County Courthouse, Brunswick, Georgia, 1897
 Grayson County Courthouse, Independence, Virginia, 1908
 Hoke County Courthouse, Raeford, North Carolina, 1900
 Lincoln County Courthouse, Stanford, Kentucky
 Lowndes County Courthouse, Valdosta, Georgia, 1905
 Magoffin County Courthouse, Salyersville, Kentucky (standard design), 1892
 Mecklenburg County Courthouse, Charlotte, North Carolina 1896
 McDowell County Courthouse and jail Welch, West Virginia
 Mineral County Jail, Keyser, West Virginia
 Mingo County Courthouse and jail, Williamson, West Virginia
 Newberry County Courthouse, Newberry, South Carolina, 1908
 Pitt County Courthouse, Greenville, North Carolina, 1910
 Putnam County Courthouse, Winfield, West Virginia
 Smyth County Courthouse Marion, Virginia
 Summers County Courthouse, Hinton, West Virginia (standard design)
 Swain County Courthouse, Bryson City, NC 1909
 Trigg County Courthouse, Cadiz, Kentucky (standard design)
 Tucker County Courthouse and Jail 1898
 Upson County Courthouse, Thomaston, Georgia 1908
 Vance County Courthouse, Henderson, North Carolina (1908 remodeling)
 Wayne County Courthouse, Monticello, Kentucky (standard design)
 Wayne County Courthouse, Goldsboro, North Carolina, 1914
 Wilcox County Courthouse, Abbeville, Georgia 1903
 Wilkes County Courthouse, Washington, Georgia 1903
 Wise County Courthouse, Wise, Virginia, 1896
 Wythe County Courthouse, Wytheville, Virginia.

Transportation
 Union Station, Raleigh, North Carolina, 1891
 Danville (Amtrak station), Southern Railway, Danville, Virginia, 1899, now "Science Station"
 Southern Railway Station, 14th & Cary Streets, Richmond, Virginia, 1900
 Union Station, 401 Main Street, Columbia, South Carolina, 1902
 Union Station, Savannah, Georgia, 1902 (demolished)
 Union Station, Augusta, Georgia, 1903, demolished 1972, now the site of a post office
 Southern Terminal, Knoxville, Tennessee, 1904
 Southern Railway Station, Charlotte, North Carolina, 1905, demolished 1960s, tower to be replicated in Museum of the New South
 Union Station, Durham, North Carolina, 1905
 Union Depot, 701 Railroad Street NW, Decatur, Alabama, 1905 (attributed to Milburn)
 Salisbury (Amtrak station), Southern Railway, Depot and Liberty Streets, Salisbury, North Carolina, 1908
 Southern Railway Station, 308 Newman Street, Hattiesburg, Mississippi, 1910
 Southern Railway Station, 825 Kemper Street, Lynchburg, Virginia, 1912
 Southern Railway station, Summerville, South Carolina
 Southern Railway station, Aiken, South Carolina.

Commercial buildings
8 West Third Street, Winston-Salem, North Carolina (Wachovia Bank Building)
 American Federation of Labor Headquarters, Washington, D.C.
 Capital Club, Raleigh, North Carolina
 Carolina National Bank building, Columbia, South Carolina
 Goff Building, Clarksburg, West Virginia, 1908
Commercial Building, Gastonia, North Carolina, 1925
 Durham Auditorium (Carolina Theater), Durham, North Carolina, 1926
 Fairmont Hotel, Fairmont, West Virginia, 1916-17
 Hotel Blanche, Lake City, Florida
 Independence Building, Charlotte, North Carolina, demolished (imploded) 1981
 Lansburgh's Department Store, Washington, D.C.
 Mechanics and Farmers Building, Durham, North Carolina, 1921
Peoples Bank Building, Rocky Mount, North Carolina, 1919
 Piedmont Office Building, Charlotte, NC
 Powhatan Hotel, Washington, D.C. 1911, demolished 1977, replaced by the National Permanent Building
 Professional Building, Raleigh, North Carolina, 1925
 Southern Loan and Trust Company, Raleigh, North Carolina.

Churches
 A.R.P. Church, Newberry, South Carolina, 1908
 Basilica of St. Peter (Columbia, South Carolina)
 First Baptist Church, Winston, NC.

Museums
 Gibbes Museum of Art, Charleston, South Carolina 1905
 Thomson Auditorium, Charleston, S.C., became Charleston Museum 1907, temporary building, burned 1982, portico left standing (p. 12) in Cannon Park.

Schools
 Alumni Hall, University of North Carolina at Chapel Hill
 Bynum Gymnasium, University of North Carolina, Chapel Hill
 Dormitory, North Carolina School for the Blind and Deaf (now re-located and known as the Governor Morehead School), Raleigh, North Carolina (Old Health Building) 1898 only remaining building
 East Dormitory, Winthrop College (University)
 George Peabody Hall, University of North Carolina at Chapel Hill
 Graded school building, Charlotte, NC
 Holland Hall, Newberry College, Newberry, South Carolina
 President's House, University of North Carolina at Chapel Hill 1906-7 (nearly all buildings on UNC campus 1898-1914)
 Slater College, Columbia Heights
 Alumni Hall, Wofford College.

Residences
 Captain Owen Daly Residence, Columbia, South Carolina
 E.H. Walker Residence, Charlotte, North Carolina
 George Fitzsimmons residence, Charlotte, North Carolina
 Heathcote, residence of B.D. Heath, Charlotte, North Carolina
 Oakhurst (Greensboro, North Carolina) on the grounds of the Oak Ridge Military Academy 1896 
 O'Donnell House, Sumter, South Carolina
 P.H. Haynes Residence, Winston-Salem, North Carolina
 Prof. M.H. Holt Residence, Oak Ridge, North Carolina
 W. Hunt Harris residence, Key West, Florida
 Yancey Milburn House, Durham, North Carolina early 1920s, designed by Thomas Yancey Milburn.

References

Frank Pierce Milburn buildings
Lists of buildings and structures by architect